Upper Dallachy is a small village situated in Moray, Scotland, approximately 2 miles south-east of Spey Bay.

The village is located next to the now-abandoned RAF Dallachy airfield, which was used frequently in the Second World War and was the site of a number of bombings. It is one of four small settlements situated on the east side of the River Spey.

External links

Villages in Moray